Silovo is a rural locality (a village) in Saminskoye Rural Settlement, Vytegorsky District, Vologda Oblast, Russia. The population was 34 as of 2002.

Geography 
Silovo is located 43 km north of Vytegra (the district's administrative centre) by road. Chekovo is the nearest rural locality.

References 

Rural localities in Vytegorsky District